Sabotin is  mountain ridge overlooking  Gorizia, Nova Gorica, and Solkan on the border between Slovenia and Italy. At its foot stands the Solkan Bridge spanning the Soča River.

Name
The mountain was first attested in written sources circa 1370 as Saluatin. The name is of unclear origin. Based on the oldest transcriptions of the name, it can be derived from *Salbotin, based on the Latin personal name Salvus (literally, 'healthy'). Another possibility (assuming that the old transcriptions are wrong) is that the name was originally Sabotin, based on the Italian name Sàb(b)ato, originally given to a child born on a Saturday. A third possibility is that it is derived from *San Valentin (there is a church dedicated to Saint Valentine on the mountain) through a number of unexpected phonological changes.

History
Sabotin represented an important defence point defending Gorizia during the Soča/Isonzo offensives. It was defended by the Austro-Hungarian 58th division. Pietro Badoglio assigned general Giuseppe Venturi's 45th division to capture Sabotin in the Sixth Battle of the Isonzo. On 6 August 1916, after a brief and bloody battle, the mountain was captured by the Italians.

References

External links

Mountains of the Slovene Littoral
Mountains under 1000 metres